Rafael Esparza (born 1981) is an American performance artist who lives and works in Los Angeles.  His work includes performances that present a toll on his physical well being and installations constructed out of adobe bricks. Esparza often works with collaborators, including members of his family.

Esparza's work has been shown at multiple private and public locations such as parks, sidewalks, nightclubs, and museums.

Early life and education
Esparza was born and raised in Pasadena, California, and is the son of Mexican immigrants from Durango, Mexico. His father, Ramón Esparza, worked in construction for over 30 years and used to make adobe bricks back in Mexico. Later on, his father taught him how to make adobe brick as a way to reconcile their relationship after Esparza came out as queer.

Esparza grew up interested in art, but realized that his art was not very relatable to the old master type of art that has been presented and critically acclaimed throughout history. As he attended East Los Angeles College during his early twenties, he began to focus on performance art. Through the Latino art collective Asco, Esparza was introduced to performance art and building installations. His interest in performance art was further solidified when he attended UCLA, where he marked the campus with different art pieces. He graduated UCLA with a bachelor's degree in fine arts.

Work and career
Esparza's work are heavily influenced by politically charged topics such as ethnicity, gender studies, and the environment. Esparza has claimed that he is influenced by his relationships between his ethnicities and society. He uses aspects of materiality, memory and (non)documentation as primary tools to question and critique ideologies that have been set and still remain today by past generations that may be outdated.
This influence reflects in his works as they sometimes tackle topics surrounding Chicano and queer histories like colonization, male sexuality, freedom, home and family. Oftentimes, Esparza dives deeper into his ideologies and attempts to critique social and racial issues within mainstream art by using his art as a way of "browning the white cube", and embodying the trials and tribulations of an immigrant's life that have helped pushed pass the narratives of traditional art spaces. Esparza's projects typically involve collaboration around local labor and land and is done with intent for a deeper spiritual connection.

Esparza's Staring at the Sun was an solo exhibition at MASS MoCA, North Adams, Massachusetts where he covered the white gallery space with adobe bricks and featured a series of new paintings on the surface of the adobe, which included portraiture, landscape, and abstraction. Esparza's intent behind this presentation was to represent his people, not only by coloring the white space within the museum with bwon adobe bricks, but also, by representing the multiple immigrants that came to America as a result of the Bracero Program. 
It was an effort to redefine the unfair prejudice that is clouded over Hispanics, expressing that they do not need any fumigation, such as the adobe bricks that decay. He also wanted to create a narrative on the importance of land.

In 2013, Esparza performed chino, indio, negro with Sebastian Hernandez at Perform Chinatown 2013. chino, indio, negro was performed near the site of the Chinese Massacre of 1871 in response to that event. 
That same year, Esparza performed El Hoyo with his brother, Beto Esparza, and fellow artist Nick Duran. El Hoyo was performed at Human Resources and reflected Esparza's identity as a queer, working-class son of immigrants.

Esparza performed in Dorian Wood's "O" video. In August 2013, Esparza and Wood performed "CONFUSION IS SEX #3" at the Sepulveda Wildlife Basin. The piece was the third installment of a performance art series organized by Dawn Kasper, Oscar Santos, and Dino Dinco. The Sepulveda Wildlife Basin, the location of "CONFUSION IS SEX #3," has in the past been used as a homeless encampment and a location for gay men to cruise for sex. In 2012, part of it was bulldozed by the US Corps of Army Engineers.

For his participation in the 2016 Made in L.A. Biennial at the Hammer Museum, Esparza created "Tierra," a field of adobe bricks created from dirt from Los Angeles. The artist's sculptures and objects were buried and unearthed in Elysian Park, a historical site of early Latinx communities' displacement.

Esparza also collaborated with artist Cassils on Independence Day 2020 to create "In Plain Sight", which was a artwork that supported abolition of mass immigrant detention, incarnation and the unfair prejudice that was displayed for immigrants, especially across the border. The project was deliberately planned to be broken down by 5 parts. First being the skytyping fleets that displayed messages over governmental institutions and facilities such as detention facilities, immigration courts, borders, and other sites of historic relevance. The steps that followed this display of art was "an interactive website, an anthology docuseries, accessible actions for the public to take to join the movement against immigrant detention, and cultural partnerships producing arts-related education and engagement."

Esparza was included in the 2017 Whitney Biennial. For the exhibition he created "igure Ground: Beyond the White Field"; a gallery made of adobe bricks inside the museum. The adobe room, which was made with dirt from Los Angeles River, was used as an exhibition space by other LA-based Latino artists that Esparza invited to participate. In 2018, Esparza's collaborative exhibition and performance event de la calle was his first solo museum presentation at the Institute of Contemporary Art, Los Angeles. Esparza used the museum's gallery for exhibition, production, and collaboration, where selected local artists and nightlife personalities worked collaboratively to produce works to display at the museum and for a performance. The performance, *a la calle*, took place in the Fashion district of downtown Los Angeles Santee Alley.

From January 20 - March 3, 2018, at the Commonwealth and Council gallery, Rafa Esparza, in collaboration with Beatriz Cortez and other artists, had an exhibition named Pasado mañana- meaning from Spanish “the day after tomorrow.” This exhibition features artwork based on the foundation of immigrant labor that is used to create a future among subjects such as race, class, and culture to become possible.

In 2020, Rafa Esparza collaborated with Eamon Ore-Giron and Gala Porras-Kim for the Art Basel 2020; their exhibition was also featured at Commonwealth and Council gallery. This exhibition featured Esparza’s paintings that was created on adobe- his artwork was dedicated to confront white supremacy through the history of colonial violence. While also connecting to indigenous people of the Americas and their connection to the land. Esparza created a painting of his older brother that showed him in a nostalgic rendition from a pre-Instagram photograph.

Public Art Collections 
Esparza's work has been showcased at many notable public art institutions. The institutions include:
 Vincent Price Art Museum, Monterey Park, CA (2013)
 Clockshop, Bowtie Project, Los Angeles (2014)
 Los Angeles Contemporary Exhibitions, CA (2015)
 Armory Center for the Arts, Pasadena (2015)
 Hammer Museum, Los Angeles (2016)
 Bemis Center for Contemporary Art, Omaha, NV (2017) 
 ArtPace, San Antonio, TX (2018)
 Museum of Contemporary Art, Los Angeles (2018)
 Performance Space New York and the Ellipse, Washington, D.C. (2019)
Kohn Gallery, Los Angeles (2020)
Commonwealth and Council, Los Angeles (2021)

References

External links
Website

Living people
Performance art in Los Angeles
American performance artists
American artists of Mexican descent
Queer artists
Hispanic and Latino American artists
American LGBT artists
1981 births